Keflavik  Air Station (NATO ID: H-1A) is a now-closed United States Air Force General Surveillance Radar station.

It was closed on 28 June 2006 as part of the closure of United States military facilities in Iceland.

History
Keflavik  Air Station was established as a North Atlantic Treaty Organization (NATO) radar station in 1992, replacing the original NATO AC&W radar site at Rockville AS, (H-1).  It was operated by the 932d Air Control Squadron and was equipped with an AN/FPS-117v5 radar.

The mission of the station was to intercept and shadow all Soviet aircraft in transit in and from the GIUK gap which passed through the detection range of its radars and relay to the NAS Keflavik Radar Operations Control Center (ROCC).

Keflavik Air Station was decommissioned on 28 June 2006.  The radar was replaced by a civilian ARSR radar and is now used for air traffic control.

See also
 List of USAF Aerospace Defense Command General Surveillance Radar Stations

References

  A Handbook of Aerospace Defense Organization 1946 - 1980,  by Lloyd H. Cornett and Mildred W. Johnson, Office of History, Aerospace Defense Center, Peterson Air Force Base, Colorado
 Winkler, David F. (1997), Searching the skies: the legacy of the United States Cold War defense radar program. Prepared for United States Air Force Headquarters Air Combat Command.
  Information for Keflavik AS, IS

Radar stations of the United States Air Force in Iceland
1992 establishments in Iceland
2006 disestablishments in Iceland